East Ural Nature Reserve is a Russian 'zapovednik' (strict nature reserve) that is near the site of the 1957 Kyshtym disaster, the world's third highest radioactivity release after Chernobyl and Fukushima. As a state "radiation reserve", the site functions for the protection of a contaminated area, and for long-term scientific study of the effects of radiation on the forest-steppe ecology on the east slope of the southern Ural Mountains. The reserve is situated in the Ozyorsk, Chelyabinsk Oblast. The reserve, as of 2007, is under the control of Rosatom, a state-run corporation, which conducts regular radiation and radio ecological monitoring.

Topography

The East Ural Reserve is oblong in shape, pointing towards the northeast, with a width of approximately 10 km and a length of 50 km.

Ecoregion and climate
East Ural Nature Reserve is located in the West Siberian taiga ecoregion, a region that covers the West Siberian Plain, from the Urals to the Central Siberian Plateau. It is a region of extensive conifer boreal forests, and also extensive wetlands, including bogs and mires.

The climate of East Ural Nature Reserve is humid continental climate, cool summer (Köppen climate classification subarctic climate). This climate is characterized by mild summers (only 1–3 months above ) and cold, snowy winters (coldest month below ).

Ecoeducation and access
As a state radiation and strict nature reserve, the East Ural Reserve is not accessible to the public.

See also
 List of Russian Nature Reserves (class 1a 'zapovedniks')

References

External links
 Map of East Ural Reserve, OpenStreetMap
 Discussion of the East Ural Reserve, and map, at Wikimapia

Nature reserves in Russia
Radioactively contaminated areas
Protected areas established in 1968
1968 establishments in Russia
Geography of Chelyabinsk Oblast
Zapovednik